HMAS Wollongong (FCPB 206), named for the city of Wollongong, New South Wales, was one of fifteen s to operate with the Royal Australian Navy (RAN). Wollongong is the only RAN vessel to have appeared in two television series, portraying a fictional Fremantle-class patrol boat in both.

Design and construction

Main propulsion machinery consisted of two MTU series 538 diesel engines, which supplied  to the two propeller shafts. Exhaust was not expelled through a funnel, like most ships, but through vents below the waterline. The ship's company consisted of 22 personnel.

Each patrol boat was armed with a single 40 mm Bofors gun as main armament, supplemented by two .50 cal Browning machineguns and an 81 mm mortar, although the mortar was removed from all ships sometime after 1988. The main weapon was originally to be two 30-mm guns on a twin-mount, but the reconditioned Bofors were selected to keep costs down; provision was made to install an updated weapon later in the class' service life, but this did not eventuate.

Wollongong was laid down by NQEA, Cairns on 23 July 1979. She was launched on 17 October 1981, and commissioned into the RAN on 28 November 1981.

Operational history

In 1983, Wollongong was one of five ships used to portray HMAS Defiance in the second season of Patrol Boat.

On 31 May 1985, Wollongong grounded on rocks at Gabo Island, causing extensive damage to the vessel. Attempts to refloat the patrol boat were made at high tide on 31 May, but an oil rig tender was unable to tow Wollongong off the rocks, as the patrol boat's propellers and shafts were pinned. Running repairs, efforts to lighten the ship by removing loose equipment, and the assistance of salvage crews with flotation bags allowed the ship to be recovered at the evening high tide of 3 June. After being towed to Eden for repairs, Wollongong was then towed to Cairns for rebuilding by NQEA, and returned to service in mid-to-late 1986. Wollongongs commanding officer was court martialed and convicted of negligence over the grounding. He was penalised with the loss of 18 months seniority.

Wollongong was deployed to the Solomon Islands during October and November 2003 as part of the Regional Assistance Mission to Solomon Islands.

Fate
Wollongong was decommissioned on 11 February 2006.

After being decommissioned from service, Wollongong one of two patrol boats used to portray HMAS Hammersley for the first season of the Australian television drama series Sea Patrol. This footage was conflated with scenes shot aboard the operational  to create the fictional patrol boat.

The patrol boat was broken up for scrap in Port Macquarie during 2007, at a cost of $400,000 to the Australian government.

Citations

References

 The chapter is available separately as Semaphore, Issue 17, 2005 in PDF and HTML formats.

Fremantle-class patrol boats
Maritime incidents in 1985
Ships built in Queensland
HMAS
1981 ships